George De Normandie Gillespie (June 14, 1819 – March 19, 1909) was the first bishop of Western Michigan in The Episcopal Church.

Early life and education
Gillespie was born on June 14, 1819, in Goshen, New York, the son of John De Normandie Gillespie and Susan Bedford. He studied at the General Theological Seminary, graduating in theology in 1840. He was awarded a Doctor of Sacred Theology in 1875 from Hobart College.

Career
Gillespie was ordained deacon on June 28, 1840, in St Peter's Church, by Bishop Benjamin T. Onderdonk of New York, and priest in St Mark's Church, Le Roy, New York, on June 30, 1843, by Bishop William H. DeLancey of Western New York. He then served as rector of St Mark's Church in Le Roy, New York, between 1840 till 1844, and then rector of St Paul's Church in Cincinnati between 1844 and 1851. In 1851, he became rector of Zion Church in Palmyra, New York, while in 1861, he transferred to Ann Arbor, Michigan, to serve as rector of St Andrew's Church.

Bishop
In 1874, Gillespie was elected as the first bishop of Western Michigan and was consecrated on February 24, 1875, by Bishop Samuel A. McCoskry of Michigan. He died in office on March 19, 1909, after a long illness.

References

"Death of Bishop Gillespie" in The Living Church, March 27, 1909, p. 712.

1819 births
1909 deaths
Episcopal bishops of Western Michigan
People from Goshen, New York
General Theological Seminary alumni
19th-century American bishops
19th-century American Episcopalians